Julia Pritt ( – ) was a Seattle area philanthropist and cofounder of Attachmate. She founded Julia's Place (a homeless family shelter in the Madrona neighborhood) and Washington Women in Need, and donated land for an Issaquah park. Pritt died in April, 2010.

The Julia Pritt House, a shelter for the homeless in Issaquah, was named for her.

Julia Pritt and Frank Pritt were Seattle software entrepreneurs, and co-founded Attachmate in their living room in 1982. They were married for 28 years, divorcing in 1990.

Pritt was born in Torrance, California in 1932 and died in Seattle in April 2010.

References

External links
 Julia's Place official website

1932 births
2010 deaths
Businesspeople from Seattle
People from Torrance, California
American women philanthropists
20th-century American businesspeople
20th-century American philanthropists
20th-century women philanthropists